Mohd Sofi bin Abdul Wahab is a Malaysian politician and served as Malacca State Executive Councillor.

Election results

Honours 
  :
  Companion Class I of the Order of Malacca (DMSM) – Datuk (2018)

References 

Living people
People from Malacca
Malaysian people of Malay descent
 National Trust Party (Malaysia) politicians
21st-century Malaysian politicians
Year of birth missing (living people)
Members of the Malacca State Legislative Assembly
 Malacca state executive councillors